Organic Family Hymnal is the first studio album by Rend Collective which was released on 28 September 2010.

Background 

Organic Family Hymnal is the first studio album by the band Rend Collective and was released on 28 September 2010. Lead singer, Gareth Gilkeson, explained the term organic means the music "came from a very deep place with God." He has also said that the most powerful song on the album is "You Bled", which he said "'It came from a point of awareness of our own faults and our own issues then getting to a place of simplicity. In the middle we take the saying from the kids' song, 'Yes, Jesus loves me'. I felt when we first started doing it that it was a bit simplistic for those who are slightly more cynical and 'cool'. It was a bit weird for them. But we came to the point where we thought, 'This is really it, Jesus loves me, this is the simplicity of what our faith is and we don't need to dress it up'.'"

Gilkeson has the song "Exalt" was "coming from a point of 'I don't know but you might'. Sometimes when we go into worship we come up with so many walls and the first verse is just letting them drop and just saying to God, 'We can't hide from you.' Then the chorus, 'I exalt you, you're the colour of my world,' that just does it for me. Life is grey but with God in our lives it becomes full of colour. The chorus is the important part where we are talking to the Lord, when we are exalting him. Sometimes in some worship songs we get distracted from that. But in this song that's what we focus on."

The song "Movements" is "a deep commitment song that says we won't walk away after a time of loss and suffering."

Critical reception 

AllMusic stated that the first 30 seconds of the first track "Come on My Soul" was "the opposite of corporate worship".

Track listing

Charts

References

2010 albums
Kingsway Music albums
Rend Collective albums